Variety View was an Australian television series which aired on Melbourne station ABV-2 from 1958 to 1959. The series was a half-hour live variety show. Some episodes were hosted by Harry Sutcliffe and Robert Peach.

In the 1 August 1958 episode, the host was Frank Rich, while the guests included instrumental group The Four Jelatis, juggler John Broadway, tenor Eric Michaelson, baritone William Laird, and singer Shirlene Clancy.

Episode status
Archival status is unknown. The 16mm sound and image negatives of a June 1958 episode may possibly be held by National Archives of Australia

References

1958 Australian television series debuts
1959 Australian television series endings
Australian variety television shows
Australian Broadcasting Corporation original programming
Black-and-white Australian television shows
English-language television shows
Australian live television series